Jean-Talon is a station of the Montreal Metro rapid transit system, operated by the Société de transport de Montréal (STM). It is located in the Little Italy district on the border between the boroughs of Rosemont—La Petite-Patrie and Villeray–Saint-Michel–Parc-Extension in Montreal, Quebec, Canada.

It is a transfer station between the Orange Line and Blue Line. The Orange Line station opened on October 14, 1966, as part of the original network of the Metro.

Overview 
The original station was designed by Duplessis, Labelle et Derome. It is a normal side platform station built in a tunnel, with a mezzanine on its southern end giving access to several exits, including underground city access to the Tour Jean-Talon.

With the construction of the Blue Line in 1986, the station was greatly expanded. Two large volumes were dug, one on either side of the original station, giving access to the stacked Blue Line platforms below. This portion of the station was designed by Gilbert Sauvé, and included artistic tiling designs by the architect as well as a large mural by Judith Bricault. Another access was built leading to the Plaza Saint-Hubert, connecting to the eastern volume by an automated entrance. The Blue Line platforms were inaugurated on June 16, 1986.

Jean-Talon is the only one of Montreal's four transfer stations that has not built that way from the beginning. 

In November 2019, it was announced that works to make both the Orange and Blue lines accessible via elevator had been completed. However,  the only other accessible station on the Blue line is Snowdon station, which also interchanges with the Orange Line.

The station has 4 entrances:
 7100 Berri Street
 430 Jean-Talon Street E.
 522 Jean-Talon Street E.
 780 Jean-Talon Street E. (automated entrance)

Origin of the name
This station is named for Jean-Talon Street. Jean Talon (1626–1694) served as intendant of New France from 1665 to 1668 and 1670 to 1672.

Connecting bus routes

Nearby points of interest
Plaza Saint-Hubert
Marché Jean-Talon
Tour Jean-Talon
Casa Italia — Centre culturel italien du Québec
Church of the Madonna della Difesa
Little Italy

References

External links

Jean-Talon Station — official site
Montreal by Metro, metrodemontreal.com — photos, information, and trivia
 2011 STM System Map
 Metro Map

Accessible Montreal Metro stations
Orange Line (Montreal Metro)
Blue Line (Montreal Metro)
Railway stations in Canada opened in 1966
Rosemont–La Petite-Patrie
Villeray–Saint-Michel–Parc-Extension